Neredukomma Srinivas, also known as Jai Srinivas, was a playback singer from the Telugu film industry. He is well known for singing devotional songs in Telugu films.

Early life 
Neredukomma Srinivas was born in Mandamarri village Manchiryal district of Telangana. He did his early schooling from Singareni high school at Mandamarri in 1993.

Movies

Death 
Srinivas died on 21 May 2021, from COVID-19 complications at a private hospital in Secunderabad.

References 

2021 deaths
Telugu playback singers
21st-century Indian male singers
21st-century Indian singers
People from Telangana
Deaths from the COVID-19 pandemic in India